RoseMary Womack (born in 1942 in Cleveland, Ohio) is an American politician.  She served as a Democratic member of the Nevada Assembly from 2006 to 2008 representing District 23, covering parts of Henderson).

Background
Womack attended Cuyahoga Community College and College of Southern Nevada.  She is a retired real estate agent and administrator of an assisted living facility.

Elections
2006 Womack won the primary election with 2,154 votes (71.99%) against Larry M. Jeppesen.  Womack won the general election with 5,863 votes (51.35%) against Republican nominee Steven Grierson.

References

External links
Official page at the Nevada Legislature
 

Date of birth missing (living people)
1942 births
Living people
College of Southern Nevada alumni
Democratic Party members of the Nevada Assembly
People from the Las Vegas Valley
People from Cleveland
Women state legislators in Nevada
21st-century American politicians
21st-century American women politicians